Tragic Week, also known as Bloody Week, was a series of riots and massacres that took place in Buenos Aires, Argentina, from January 7 to January 14, 1919. The uprising was led by anarchists and communists, and was eventually crushed by the Argentine Federal Police, the military, and the Argentine Patriotic League. Estimates of the death toll vary, but are usually in the hundreds, mostly of workers at the hands of the government forces.

Background

From 1902 until 1909 the FORA (Federacion Obrera Regional Argentina, founded by Italian immigrant Pietro Gori, an Italian anarchist of international renown) waged a long campaign of general strikes against both employers and anti-labour legislation. In May 1904, a clash between workers and police left two dead and fifteen injured. In 1907, the feminist-anarchist league was established in Buenos Aires. On 17 January 1908, bomb planted by an anarchist in a Buenos Aires train killed 35-year-old Salvador Stella and wounded several other passengers near Constitución Railway Station. By the end of the decade, police crackdowns and worker militancy had incited each to greater heights. Ultimately on May Day, 1909, a giant gathering marched through Buenos Aires and was broken up by police, resulting in 12 killed and 100 wounded. It was reported at the time that anarchists had provoked the violence. Argentine President José Figueroa Alcorta narrowly himself escaped death when an anarchist bomb was thrown at him while he was driving in Buenos Aires on 28 February 1908. Government officials were again thrown into panic by a 19-year-old anarchist, Ukrainian immigrant Simón Radowitzky. With a hand-held bomb, he killed the city's police chief, Ramón Falcón, and his aide, Alberto Lartigau, who were driving through Callao street in Buenos Aires on 15 November 1909. On 16 October 1909, bombs exploded at the Spanish consulate in the city of Rosario, injuring an anarchist and damaging the building. A result of Falcón's assassination was the formation of the self-styled "Patriotic students" organisation (Juventud Autonomista) in late 1909. On 25 May 1910, in an effort to disrupt the Argentine centennial celebrations in Buenos Aires, an anarchist gave a bomb to an unsuspecting boy to carry into a cathedral. The bomb exploded prematurely, killing the boy and costing another both arms. On 28 June 1910, another bomb exploded in the Teatro Colón, injuring 20 theatre-goers. As a result, the Senate and Chamber of Deputies passed a bill providing for capital punishment for those anarchists responsible for causing death. On 9 July 1916, an attempt to assassinate President Victorino de la Plaza was made by a gun-wielding self-confessed anarchist. The attempt was made while reviewing troops during an Argentine independence centennial celebration. On 9 February 1918, violent strikes took place across Argentina and regular troops were rushed to the affected areas after anarchists wrecked trains, destroyed tracks, and burned carriages laden with wheat.

Conflict

The conflict began as a strike at the Vasena metal works, an English Argentine-owned plant in the suburbs of Buenos Aires. The strike at first attracted no attention, but on 3 January the picketing workers fired on and wounded three policemen who were escorting wagonloads of metal to the Vasena factory. On 4 January, a mortally Police NCO (Vicente Chávez) succumbs to his wounds. On 7 January an unrelated event took place: the maritime workers of the port of Buenos Aires voted a general strike for  better hours and wages. That same day, at Vasena metal works, the police, who had surrounded the strikers, fought it out with the striking workers after they overturned and set fire to the car of the police chief Elpidio González, who had arrived to broker a deal with the union leaders, and the militant workers shot and killed Army Second Lieutenant Antonio Marotta, commander of the detachment protecting the police commander. Five workers were killed and twenty wounded in the resulting clashes. A student, Pascual Arregui, of the Manifestación Patriótica (Patriotic Manifestation) vigilante movement is also killed in this action.

That night, militant workers gathered in Pueyrredón Street, shot and killed Army Sergeant Ramón Díaz. In nearby Corrientes Street, the commander of a rifle platoon, Second Lieutenant Agustín Ronzoni is shot and killed along with an innocent male civilian when surrounded and attacked by workers seeking revenge for their earlier losses. A rifle platoon from the Argentine Army is ambushed in Lavalle Street by hidden gunmen firing from inside houses. A night patrol under the command of Army Sergeant Bonifacio Manzo is also ambushed near the Constitución-Mármol Farm Estate. In the meantime, a company of the 7th Infantry Regiment is forced to use their Vickers machine-guns in order to keep the demonstrators at bay in Buenos Aires. A company of riflemen is also forced to come to the rescue of a police detachment holding out from rooftops that had been completely surrounded in the night fighting. Paramedics and ambulance drivers, transporting the badly wounded and injured in the hours of darkness to nearby hospitals, are forced to carry pistols in order to defend themselves from the out of control mobs. At the break of dawn, the 3rd Infantry Regiment is forced to deploy around the Vasena factory to prevent a huge crowd numbering in their thousands from burning down the building along with the 400 workers trapped inside that had refused to take part in the violent protests.

The next day, Wednesday 8 January, the waterfront strike began: all ship movements, and all loading and unloading, came to a halt. On Thursday 9 January, funerals were held for the five workers who had been killed by the police. A procession of 150 mourners, some of them armed, followed the funeral coaches, and as they passed, they attacked property and burned an automobile, before reaching Lacroze, a British-owned tram station, which they attacked. The group then broke into the Convent of the Sacred Heart, at Yatay Street and Corrientes Avenue, and set the church on fire. As the group were attacking a store, the police caught up with them, fired into the procession, and killed and wounded numerous demonstrators.

Mobs went on the rampage all over the city. Groups overturned and burned streetcars and robbed sports shops for the guns and ammunition inside. In the afternoon, at 3pm, 3,000 people stormed Lacroze Station. Violence also erupted in the Congress, where members of the Argentine Chamber of Deputies reportedly threw notebooks at each other, rather than taking action.

The funeral procession stopped a suburban train at a railroad crossing and broke every window in the carriages. At the Vasena Workshop, angry crowds pushed garbage wagons against the doors to break them down in an attempt at lynching the British managers who were besieged inside. The British Minister appealed to the President Hipólito Yrigoyen for help. Yrigoyen gave the order to shoot to kill, but as the toll of dead and wounded mounted, the mobs became more frantic and destructive.

On the night of 9–10 January, the Argentine Regional Workers' Federation (Federación Obrera Regional Argentina or FORA) met to consider police action and voted for a general strike for 24 hours throughout the city of Buenos Aires. That night, reinforcements in the form of a rifle platoon from the 4th Infantry Regiment, including a Vickers machine-gun detachment, were sent to help defend the 28th Police Station that was on the verge of being overrun. In all 30,000 officers and men of the Argentine Army would take part in the fighting and subsequent mopping-up operations in Buenos Aires in January 1919.

On Friday 10 January, Private Luis Demarchi from the 8th Cavalry Regiment is shot and killed defending the Once de Septiembre Railway Station. That day there were no newspapers; markets, stores, hotels and bars were closed, and transportation and communication networks (including the telephone lines) were stopped.

On the night of 10–11 January, two policemen, Corporal Teófilo Ramírez and Agent Ángel Giusti, were reported killed defending their police stations as thousands of strikers tried to storm 8 police stations and seize their armouries as well as the police headquarters building in downtown Buenos Aires. In the meantime, 30 gunmen using the cover of darkness, attempt to ransack the armoury of the 8th Infantry Regiment in Campo de Mayo Army Barracks but the attackers are forced to retreat by the defenders in the form of a rifle platoon under Lieutenant Horacio Orstein.

In the fierce fighting, police reinforcements emerged in the form of vigilantes from the Argentine Patriotic League. Targeting the city's sizable Jewish population, the right wing League sought pogroms, and brought an ever-growing list of dead and wounded Jews to the newspaper columns. Mobs were running the streets, shouting "death to the Rusos," a reference to Argentine Jews, who were mainly Russian, and identified in the minds of those in the League and the like-minded as anarchists and Bolsheviks. The Russian Jewish sections of Buenos Aires were invaded, and terrified Jews were dragged from their homes, beaten, shot and killed; some escaped by pleading they were Italians.

Food shortages in the city became acute, and eggs that were selling for 90 cents a dozen in the morning reached 3 pesos (US$1.35) by evening.  The railroad union voted to stop trains all over the country in a sympathy strike. The union ordered its members back to work, and issued a statement disclaiming all responsibility for the killings.

The Montevideo police had informed the authorities of Buenos Aires that they had uncovered a Communist plot to seize both sides of Río de la Plata with the taking of the capitals of Argentina and Uruguay. On Sunday the police informed the press that they had broken into a private apartment where 40 persons, all of them Russian Jews, were in session as the "First Soviet of the Federal Republic of Argentine Soviets."

On 11 January, strikers in the suburb of Barracas tried to seize the local police station but were forced to retreat after a 4-hour gunbattle, leaving behind several dead when firemen armed with rifles and army reinforcements from the 4th Infantry Regiment arrived.

Placing the city under martial law, President Yrigoyen appointed General Luis Dellepiane as the commander of riot control forces, after which disturbances subsided. The 5th and 12th Army Cavalry Regiments arrived on 12 January, and 300 marines and a mountain artillery regiment also entered Buenos Aires. On the morning of 13 January 1919, a group of anarchists attempted to seize arms and ammunition from a local police station but were forced to retreat after coming under fire from a naval infantry detachment from the cruiser ARA San Martin. Another 600 naval infantry reinforcements also arrive from the cruisers ARA Belgrano, ARA Garibaldi and ARA Buenos Aires that lay anchor in Dársena Norte. The role of young army lieutenant Juan Domingo Perón, future president of Argentina, as commander of a Vicker's machine-gun detachment is disputed by historians.

Casualties

The leftist Vanguardia newspaper claimed that over 700 deaths were recorded on Tragic Week, as well as 2,000 injured. The leftist La Protesta newspaper claimed that 45,000 were arrested. According to the Argentine Federal Police Grouping (Agrupación de la Policía Federal or AGPFA) Report the real number of arrests were 3,579.

Professor Patricia Marchak estimates the real number of workers killed at more than 100. La Nación newspaper reported the number of workers killed in the uprising at around 100 and 400 injured. In his official report, Police chief Octavio A. Pinero from the 9th Police Station, claims there were 141 killed in the uprisings and 521 wounded.

The police forces suffered three killed and nearly 80 wounded. The Argentine Army suffered five killed and around one-hundred wounded/injured. The vigilante forces supporting the Army and Police units suffered one killed (Pascual Arregui) and several wounded/injured.

The United States embassy reported that 1,500 people were killed in total, "mostly Russians and generally Jews," and that many women were raped.

Aftermath

On 24 December 1927, anarchists planted bombs at two U.S. bank branches in Buenos Aires resulting in the multiple injuries of twenty bank staff and customers. The Italian Consulate in Buenos Aires was bombed on 23 May 1928, and seven were killed and nearly 50 wounded in the anarchist bombing. On 24 December 1929, 44-year-old Italian-born anarchist Gualterio Marinelli was killed in his attempt to assassinate Argentine president Hipólito Yrigoyen (who had ordered the army to suppress the metalworkers' strike of 1919) but he manages to wound two policemen. On September 6, 1930, Yrigoyen was deposed in a military coup led by General José Félix Uriburu. The Uriburu regime shut down Anarchist and Communist presses and made it difficult, if not impossible, for anarchists to spread their ideals. Uriburu ordered the mass deportation of Spanish and Italian workers that had joined the anarchists and the changing political, economic and social conditions "led to the decline of this movement, particularly in its manifestation within the labor movement". Nevertheless, on 20 January 1931, three anarchist bombs went off at three strategic places on the Buenos Aires railway network, killing three and wounding 17. On 29 January 1931, Severino Di Giovanni, mastermind of the railway bombings, was ambushed in downtown Buenos Aires and captured in a gun-battle with police, killing two officers and a five-year-old girl, then turned the gun on himself. Nevertheless, Di Giovanni was stabilized and, after a brief period of recovery and interrogation, was executed in the grounds of the National Penitentiary on 1 February 1931.

See also
 Patagonia rebelde
 Argentine Regional Workers' Federation
 List of cases of police brutality in Argentina

Bibliography
 Godio, Julio (1985). La Semana Trágica de enero de 1919 . Buenos Aires, Argentina: Hyspamérica. 
 Pigna, Felipe (2006). Los mitos de la historia argentina: De la ley Sáenz Peña a los albores del peronismo. Buenos Aires: Editorial Planeta. 
 Schiller, Herman (2005). Momentos de luchas populares. Buenos Aires: Ediciones Instituto Movilizador de Fondos Cooperativos.

References

Anarchism in Argentina
Labour disputes in Argentina
Protests in Argentina
Riots and civil disorder in Argentina
History of Argentina (1916–1930)
Massacres in Argentina
Massacres committed by Argentina
Anarcho-syndicalism
Anti-anarchism
Police misconduct in Argentina
Conflicts in 1919
1919 in Argentina
1919 riots
Mass murder in 1919
January 1919 events
Anti-Jewish pogroms
Revolutions of 1917–1923
1919 murders in Argentina
1919 disasters in South America